Tiquadra  reversella is a moth of the family Tineidae. It is known from Brazil.

References

Hapsiferinae
Moths described in 1866
Moths of South America